Lacey Entertainment is an American entertainment company. The company focuses on the creation, production, packaging and distribution of entertainment content across a number of genres including films, documentaries, light entertainment, and children's animated programs.

It was founded in 1994 by Brian Lacey, an entertainment executive, who has been actively engaged in the production, marketing, and distribution of content totaling nearly 4,000 episodes broadcast in over 120 countries in a variety of genres, most notably in popular children's content over the past three decades such as Pokémon, Yu-Gi-Oh, Teenage Mutant Ninja Turtles, Voltron, and Shin chan and Dinosaur King.

In 2016, Lacey engineered a worldwide (excluding the US) broadcast agreement with Viacom for broadcast on the Nick Jr. platforms for the young children's animated series Kiva Can Do! from the Dublin-based studio Kavaleer Productions. The series was broadcast in 24 languages covering more than 130 countries worldwide.

Lacey's former involvement with 4Kids Entertainment included the international (excluding Asia) distribution of Pokémon and Yu-Gi-Oh!. Lacey also executed the successful re-launch of the classic action adventure series Teenage Mutant Ninja Turtles (TMNT). The Pokemon, Yu-Gi-Oh and TMNT series continue to be exhibited on multiple media outlets, including OTT platforms around the world. The Dinosaur King series is currently exhibited on Netflix, entertaining kids in English, Japanese, Spanish, French and Portuguese languages.

Lacey has engineered broadcast placement among the leading platforms worldwide, such as Disney Channel, Nickelodeon, Cartoon Network, the  BBC, ITV Network, GMTV, Sky TV, TF1, France Television, M6, Lagardere, YTV, Mediaset, RTL II, TEN Network, Nine Network, Telecinco, Antena 3, Télé-Quebec, Universal Kids and many others, including major OTT platforms worldwide.

In early 2000, Lacey orchestrated the global roll out of the Japanese animated comedy cult series, Shin chan (Crayon Shin-chan). Executive producing the English language adaptation of this offbeat and slightly controversial series, Lacey's distribution efforts cleared the series in over 90 countries where the content garnered outstanding audience ratings.

In 1996, Lacey introduced the light entertainment series America's Dumbest Criminals. Lacey co-owns all rights to this brand and represents the entire 104 half-hour episode library for all media exploitation. America's Dumbest Criminals currently is exhibited on multiple OTT platforms where it enjoys a cult-like following in the US, Canada and around the world.

Lacey also packaged the co-production (France, UK and Canada) of the classic Mr. Men and Little Miss property as a 52 episode comedy series. The series was introduced to American audiences in 1997 via first-run syndication, and later broadcast on Cartoon Network. Over the years, Lacey packaged and executive produced a number of co-productions involving French, UK, Canadian, Japanese, Korean and other Asian broadcasters and producers, including the comedy series Rocket Monkeys with Breakthrough Entertainment of Canada that premiered on Nickelodeon in the US.

References

External links
Lacey Entertainment Official website

Entertainment companies established in 1994
Entertainment companies of the United States